Perissoneura is a genus of caddisflies in the family Odontoceridae.

Species 
 Perissoneura chrysea
 Perissoneura diversipennis
 Perissoneura paradoxa

References 

 Taxonomicon entry
 ITIS entry

Trichoptera genera